Zdenka or Zdeňka is a feminine given name in Croatian, Czech, Slovak, Serbian, and Slovenian, originally a short form of Zdeslava. Notable people with the name include:

 Zdenka Badovinac, Slovenian art critic
 Zdenka Braunerová, Czech painter
 Zdenka Cecília Schelingová, Slovak nun

 Zdenka Fantlová, Czech actor, writer and Holocaust survivor

 Zdenka Grossmannová, Czechoslovak canoer

 Zdenka Hradilova, Czechoslovak canoer
 Zdenka Kovačiček, Croatian singer
 Zdenka Kramplová, Slovak politician
 Zdenka Podkapová, Czech model
 Zdenka Predná, Slovak singer
 Zdeňka Šilhavá, Czech athlete
 Zdenka Ticharich, Hungarian pianist
 Zdeňka Vávrová, Czech astronomer
 Zdeňka Veřmiřovská, Czechoslovakian (Moravian) artistic gymnast
 3364 Zdenka, an asteroid named for her
 Zdenka, fictional character in the opera Arabella

See also
 Zdeslava
 Zdenko

Slavic feminine given names
Czech feminine given names